Hiroki Kondo may refer to:
Hiroki Kondo (tennis) (born 1982), Japanese tennis player
Hiroki Kondo (outfielder) (born 1993), Japanese baseball outfielder
Hiroki Kondo (pitcher) (born 1995), Japanese baseball pitcher